Chronological lists of classical composers list composers of classical music in chronological order, either organized by era or style, or by nationality.

By era or style
List of classical music composers by era
List of medieval composers
List of Renaissance composers
List of Baroque composers
List of Classical-era composers
List of Romantic-era composers
List of 20th-century classical composers

Other classifications
Chronological lists of classical composers by nationality

See also
Lists of composers